Babyonki is a rural locality (a village) in Novoselskoye Rural Settlement, Kovrovsky District, Vladimir Oblast, Russia. The population was 48 as of 2010. There are 2 streets.

Geography 
Babyonki is located 10 km southwest of Kovrov (the district's administrative centre) by road. Novy is the nearest rural locality.

References 

Rural localities in Kovrovsky District